The 2006 Lafayette Leopards football team represented Lafayette College in the 2006 NCAA Division I FCS football season. The team was led by Frank Tavani, in his seventh season as head coach. The Leopards were co-champions of the Patriot League. 

Before the first home game of 2006, Lafayette renovated the football team's longtime home stadium, Fisher Field. The Leopards played their home games at the renamed Fisher Field at Fisher Stadium in Easton, Pennsylvania. All games were broadcast on the Lafayette Sports Network (LSN).

Schedule

References

Lafayette
Lafayette Leopards football seasons
Patriot League football champion seasons
Lafayette Leopards football